Quixotic may refer to:

 Quixotism, deriving from the novel Don Quixote
 Quixotic (album), an album by Martina Topley-Bird
 Quix*o*tic, a Washington D.C.–based rock band